Mehtap TV was a channel that began broadcasting on 19 June 2006 via the Turksat 2-A satellite. Murat Keskin was the executive editor of Mehtap TV. On 19 July 2016, its license was revoked and the channel closed by the Radio and Television Supreme Council due to alleged links with the Gülen Movement following the 2016 Turkish coup d'état attempt.
The channel is known for its closeness to Fethullah Gülen, the leader of the Gülen movement.

References

External links
Mehtap TV
Mehtap TV at LyngSat Address

24-hour television news channels in Turkey
Companies formerly affiliated with the Gülen movement
Defunct television channels in Turkey
Islamic television networks
Mass media shut down in the 2016 Turkish purges
Turkish-language television stations
Television channels and stations established in 2006
Television channels and stations disestablished in 2016